Acetylornithinase may refer to:
 Acetylornithine deacetylase, an enzyme
 Glutamate N-acetyltransferase, an enzyme